The Tea Board of India is a state agency of the Government of India under the control of Ministry of Commerce and Industry, established to promote the cultivation, processing, and domestic trade as well as export of tea from India. It was established by the enactment of the Tea Act in 1953 with its headquarters in Kolkata (formerly Calcutta). It is headed by the Deputy Chairman Mr.P.K.Sahoo, IOFS and separated into Standing Committees referred to as the Executive Committee, the Development Committee, the Labour Welfare Committee and the Export Promotion Committee.

Functions
The Tea Board India is responsible for the assignment of certification numbers to exports of certain tea merchants. This certification is intended to ensure the teas’ origin, which in turn would reduce the amount of fraudulent labelling on rare teas such as  ones harvested in Darjeeling. The excessive amounts of 'faux' Darjeeling tea sold on the global market relates in stark opposition to the fraction of exporters which are licensed by the Tea Board India as legitimate traders of this region.

The Tea Board India's tasks include endorsement of the diverse production and productivity of tea, financial support of research organisations and the monitoring of advances in tea packaging as it relates to health beneficial aspects.

It coordinates research institutes, the tea trade and government bodies, ensuring the technical support of the tea trade in the global industry.

Global Offices
The headquarter of the board is located in Kolkata of West Bengal. The board also has other overseas offices located at London in United Kingdom, Moscow in Russia and Dubai in United Arab Emirates. The Tea Board also had an office in New York City in the 1960s to 70s. Mr P V Ramaswamy was the first director of the NYC office from 1960 to 1963 and also returned to head it from 1973 to 1975.

See also 
 Assam tea
 Darjeeling tea
 Indian Tea Association
 Kangra tea
 Tea
 Tocklai Tea Research Institute
 Coffee Board of India

References

Sources
 Tea Board India self-description

External links
 Tea Board India home page
 Interview of Roshni Sen, Deputy Chairman, Tea Board of India

Ministry of Commerce and Industry (India)
Organisations based in Kolkata
1954 establishments in West Bengal
Tea industry in India